Calvary Christian School may refer to these schools in the United States:

 Trinity Christian High School (Monterey, California), formerly known as Calvary Christian High School

 Calvary Christian High School (Clearwater, Florida)

 Calvary Christian School (Covington, Kentucky)
 Calvary Christian School (King, North Carolina)